Varedo railway station is a railway station in Italy. It serves the town of Varedo.

Services
Varedo is served by lines S2 and S4 of the Milan suburban railway network, operated by the Lombard railway company Trenord.

References

External links

 Ferrovienord official site - Varedo railway station 

Railway stations in Lombardy
Ferrovienord stations
Railway stations opened in 1879
Milan S Lines stations